Malekoula Airport , also known as Lamap Airport, is an airfield near Lamap on the island of Malekoula, in the Malampa province in Vanuatu. It is one of two airfields on the island, the other being Norsup Airport in the north.

Facilities

Airlines and destinations

References

External links
 
 

Airports in Vanuatu
Malampa Province